Piano Bass Drums is the fifth album and first live album by Australian improvised music trio The Necks released on the Fish of Milk label in 1998. The album features a single track titled "Unheard", performed by Chris Abrahams, Lloyd Swanton and Tony Buck recorded in concert at The Basement in Sydney, Australia.

Reception
The album was nominated for Jazz album of the Year in the 1998 ABC Classic FM awards.  At the APRA Music Awards of 1999 "Unheard" won Most Performed Jazz Work.

Track listing
All compositions by The Necks
 "Unheard" - 53:24

Personnel

Chris Abrahams — piano
Lloyd Swanton — bass
Tony Buck — drums

References

APRA Award winners
The Necks live albums
1998 live albums